Hafiz Ahmed Mazumder (born 29 March 1935) is a Bangladesh Awami League politician, former chairman of the Bangladesh Red Crescent Society and Pubali Bank Limited, businessman, and a member of parliament.

He served as the Chairman of the Board of Directors of Pubali Bank Limited. He also served as the chairman of Bangladesh Red Crescent Society.

Early life and education
Mahmudur Rahman Majumdar was born in Zakiganj, Karimganj, Assam Province (now Sylhet District, Bangladesh). He went to the Chandinagar Primary School in Cachar, India and then the Jessore Zilla School which he completed in 1951. He graduated from the Murari Chand College in 1953, and then moved on to study at the Brojomohun College in Barisal.

Career
In 1985, he established the Hafiz Majumdar Education Trust to help develop education in Sylhet district. He is the founder and chairman of academic council of Scholarshome and also founded the Hafsa Majumdar Women's College, the Sajjad Majumdar Bidyaniketan and the Hafiz Majumdar Bidyaniketan. His services to society has won him numerous awards such as the Khwaja Bahadur Ahsanullah Gold Medal, from the Ahsania Mission in 2011.

Mazumder was elected to Parliament in the 2008 Bangladesh General Election as a candidate of Bangladesh Awami League from Sylhet-5. He beat Moulana Farid Uddin Chowdhury, former member of parliament from Jamaat-e-Islami Bangladesh, by 31 thousand votes. He was appointed the chairman of Bangladesh Red Crescent Society on 9 April 2015. He did not receive nomination for the 2014 Bangladesh General Election from Bangladesh Awami League. Instead the nomination went to Mashuk Uddin Ahmed. he founded Hafiz Mazumder Education Trust to improve education in Sylhet.

On 12 May 2010 he was re-elected Chairman of the Board of Directors of Pubali Bank. On 27 April 2012 he was re-elected again as chairman of the bank. On 25 February 2014 Mazumder was removed from the post of chairman of Pubali Bank by an order of Bangladesh High Court along with 7 directors of the bank. The High Court gave the order in response to a petition filed by Shafee Ahmed Chowdhury, a shareholder of the bank. He was re-elected Chairman of the board on 5 April 2015. He served as the Chairman of the Board of Directors of Pubali Bank till 8 May 2016 when he retired. He was replaced by Habibur Rahman. Mazumder was appointed as an adviser to Pubali bank. His daughter, Runa Laila Hafiz, was made a director of the Pubali Bank.

References

Awami League politicians
Living people
11th Jatiya Sangsad members
7th Jatiya Sangsad members
9th Jatiya Sangsad members
1935 births
People from Zakiganj Upazila
Brojomohun College alumni
Murari Chand College alumni